Naolamari is a village in Khaskara Union, Alamdanga Upazila, Chuadanga District, Bangladesh. The village has a population of 1,432 people.

History
The meaning of this village is "to hit a nine" with the word Naola (নওলা) referring to a Nine in playing cards.

During the Bangladesh Liberation War of 1971, two notable freedom fighters of this village were Muhammad Rabiul Islam ibn Zahir Uddin and Muhammad Ajibur Rahman ibn Muin Uddin.

Facilities
There are two mosques in the village; the Nowlamary Jame Masjid and the East Nowlamary Jame Masjid. The village has one eidgah; the Nowlamary Eidgah Maydan. The Nowlamary Sporting Club is the largest sports organisation in the village. The Nowlamary beel is a site of attraction. Educational institutions include the Nowlamary Alim Madrasa and Nowlamary Government Primary School. The village's Mawlana Arshadul Alam Orphanage and Lillah Boarding takes care of orphan children.

Notable people
Muhammad Masud Biswas, executive director for Bangladesh Bank
Prof. Muhammad Mahbubur Rahman ibn Arshadul Alam of the Physics Department of Government K.C. College Jhenaidah

References

Chuadanga District
Populated places in Khulna Division